The Island is a daily English-language newspaper in Sri Lanka. It is published by Upali Newspapers. A sister newspaper of Divaina, The Island was established in 1981. Its Sunday edition, Sunday Island, commenced publishing in 1991. The daily newspaper currently has a circulation of 70,000 and its Sunday edition, 103,000 per issue. Upali Wijewardene was its founder. Its political leaning is pro-Sri Lanka Freedom Party.

See also

List of newspapers in Sri Lanka

References

External links

Daily newspapers published in Sri Lanka
English-language newspapers published in Sri Lanka
Publications established in 1981
Upali Newspapers